Ball Glacier may refer to:

 Ball Glacier (James Ross Island), Antarctica
 Ball Glacier (Victoria Land), Antarctica
 Ball Glacier (New Zealand)